Riley Leroy Pitts (October 15, 1937 – October 31, 1967) was a United States Army captain and the first African-American officer to receive the Medal of Honor. The medal was presented posthumously by President Lyndon B. Johnson on December 10, 1968 for actions in Ap Dong, Republic of Vietnam.

Early life and education 
Riley Leroy Pitts was born in Fallis, Oklahoma. He attended Wichita State University and graduated in 1960 with a degree in journalism. He married Eula Mae Pitts and had a daughter, Stacie, and a son, Mark, while employed with Boeing. Mark became an active member of the organization "Sons and Daughters In Touch", where he has traveled to Vietnam to memorialize his father. Pitts is buried in Hillcrest Memory Gardens at Spencer, Oklahoma.

Military career 
After being commissioned as an officer in the United States Army, he was sent to Vietnam in December 1966. Pitts had seven years of service in the Army.

In Vietnam, Pitts served as an information officer until he was transferred to a combat unit. As a Captain, he then served as commander of Company C, 2d Battalion, 27th Infantry, 25th Infantry Division. On October 31, 1967, just one month before he was to be rotated back home, his unit was called upon to reinforce another company heavily engaged against a strong enemy force.

After his company landed in an airmobile assault near Ap Dong, Binh Duong Province, several Viet Cong opened fire with automatic weapons. Captain Pitts led an assault which overran the enemy positions and was then ordered to move north to reinforce another company engaged against a strong enemy force. As his company moved forward intense fire was received from three directions, including four bunkers, two of which were within 15 meters of his position. His rifle fire proving ineffective against the enemy due to the dense foliage, Pitts picked up an M79 grenade launcher and began pinpointing the targets. Seizing a grenade taken from a captured Viet Cong's web gear, he lobbed it at a bunker to his front but it hit the foliage and rebounded. Without hesitation, Pitts threw himself on top of the grenade which, fortunately, failed to explode. He then directed the repositioning of the company to permit friendly artillery to be fired. Upon completion of the fire mission, he again led his men toward the enemy positions, personally killing at least one more Viet Cong. Displaying complete disregard for his personal safety, he maintained continuous fire, pinpointing the enemy's fortified positions, while at the same time directing and urging his men forward, until he was mortally wounded.

Awards and decorations

Medal of Honor citation

Ceremony 
President Lyndon B. Johnson presented the Medal of Honor to Mrs. Eula Pitts and his son and daughter on December 10, 1968. In presenting the award, Johnson declared,

What this man did in an hour of incredible courage will live in the story of America as long as America endures - as he will live in the hearts and memories of those who loved him. He was a brave man and a leader of men. No greater thing could be said of any man.

Captain Pitts' mother and father, Mr. and Mrs. Theodore H. Pitts, attended the presentation; also in attendance were Secretary of Defense Clark M. Clifford, Chairman of the Joint Chiefs of Staff General Earle Wheeler, and Secretary of the Army Stanley Rogers Resor.

Honors 
Post No. GR07 of The American Legion, Department of France, at Wiesbaden, Germany, is named after him. The Post was originally chartered on April 15, 1988, at Worms, Federal Republic of Germany.

See also  
 List of African American Medal of Honor recipients
 List of Medal of Honor recipients for the Vietnam War
 List of people from Oklahoma

Notes

References

Further reading

External links 

 
 Riley L. Pitts at the Vietnam War Commemoration (vietnamwar50th.com)

1937 births
1967 deaths
American military personnel killed in the Vietnam War
Burials in Oklahoma
Military personnel from Oklahoma
People from Lincoln County, Oklahoma
Recipients of the Silver Star
United States Army Medal of Honor recipients
United States Army officers
Vietnam War recipients of the Medal of Honor
Wichita State University alumni
United States Army personnel of the Vietnam War